Mauritius has only qualified for one Africa Cup of Nations, which was the 1974 edition held in Egypt. The team lost all three matches and went out in the group stage.

Overall record

Competitive performance and squads

Egypt 1974

Group B

References

Africa Cup of Nations - Archives competitions - cafonline.com

Mauritius national football team
Countries at the Africa Cup of Nations